is a former Japanese football player. He played for Japan national team.

Club career
Kawachi was born in Hiroshima Prefecture on April 27, 1955. After graduating from Osaka University of Commerce, he joined his local club, the Toyo Industries (later Mazda) in 1978. Although the club won second place in the 1978 Emperor's Cup, the club performance was not good and he also played in Division 2. He retired in 1987. He played 92 games and scored 11 goals in Division 1.

National team career
On June 16, 1979, Kawachi debuted for Japan national team against South Korea. He played 3 games for Japan in 1979.

National team statistics

References

External links
 
 Japan National Football Team Database

1955 births
Living people
Osaka University of Commerce alumni
Association football people from Hiroshima Prefecture
Japanese footballers
Japan international footballers
Japan Soccer League players
Sanfrecce Hiroshima players
Association football midfielders